Vladimir Pavlovich Belousov (born 14 July 1946) is a Soviet former ski jumper. He was the only Soviet ski jumper to medal at the Olympics and is the only person from the Soviet Union or Russia to win a gold medal in ski jumping in both the Winter Olympics and the Holmenkollen. He was awarded the Medal "For Labour Valour" in 1969 and the Order of Friendship in 2011.

Belousov won a gold medal in the individual large hill at the 1968 Olympics, placing eighth in the normal hill. At the Holmenkollen ski festival, he won the ski jumping competition in 1968 and 1970. He became the Honoured Master of Sports of the USSR in 1968 and won the USSR Championship in 1969. In 1978 he graduated from the Military Institute of Physical Culture and later worked as a coach.

References

External links 

 – click Vinnere for downloadable pdf file 

1946 births
Living people
Russian male ski jumpers
Soviet male ski jumpers
People from Vsevolozhsky District
Ski jumpers at the 1968 Winter Olympics
Holmenkollen Ski Festival winners
Honoured Masters of Sport of the USSR
Olympic gold medalists for the Soviet Union
Olympic ski jumpers of the Soviet Union
Armed Forces sports society athletes
Olympic medalists in ski jumping
Medalists at the 1968 Winter Olympics
Sportspeople from Leningrad Oblast